The smooth deep-sea skate (Brochiraja asperula) is a skate in the family Arhynchobatidae. It is found off New Zealand, at depths of from 200 to 1,300 m on the continental shelf.  Their length is from 30 to 50 cm.

Conservation status 
The New Zealand Department of Conservation has classified the smooth deep-sea skate as "Data deficient" under the New Zealand Threat Classification System.

References

Rajidae
Endemic marine fish of New Zealand
Fish described in 1974